John Samuel Ingram (November 15, 1902 – February 20, 1969) was an American film and television actor. He appeared in many serials and Westerns between 1935 and 1966.

Biography
Ingram served in the U.S. Army in France. After leaving the military, he gave up plans to study law and instead joined a traveling minstrel show. He acted in stock theater with several companies before going into film. Ingram first appeared on screen in a bit part in Westward Ho (1935). His first film credit came in the serial Zorro Rides Again (1937).

In addition to acting, Ingram was a stunt man, working with horses and cars in films in the early 1930s.

He was born in Frankfort, Illinois, and died in Canoga Park, California, of a heart attack. He was interred in the Oakwood Memorial Park Cemetery in Chatsworth, California. Ingram also acquired a movie ranch in 1944; several Western films were shot there.

In 1944, Ingram married Eloise Fullerton.

Selected appearances

Films

 Westward Ho (1935)
 The Lonely Trail (1936)
 Winds of the Wasteland (1936)
 Hearts in Bondage (1936)
 Rebellion (1936)
 Headline Crasher (1936)
 Wild Horse Rodeo (1937)
 Valley of Terror (1937)
 Whistling Bullets (1937)
 Outlaws of Sonora (1938)
 Frontier Scout (1938)
 Phantom Gold (1938)
 Riders of the Black Hills (1938)
 Frontiers of '49 (1939)
 The Night Riders (1939)
 New Frontier (1939)
 Wyoming Outlaw (1939)
 Melody Ranch (1940)
 Ridin' the Trail (1940)
 Under Texas Skies (1940)
 The Lone Rider Ambushed (1941)
 Prairie Pioneers (1941)
 The Gang's All Here (1941)
 The Lone Rider and the Bandit (1941)
 The Lone Rider in Cheyenne (1941)
 Man from Cheyenne (1942)
 Arizona Stage Coach (1942)
 The Mysterious Rider (1942)
 Santa Fe Scouts (1943)
 Riders of the Rio Grande (1943)
 Wolves of the Range (1943)
 Arizona Trail (1943)
 Fugitive of the Plains (1943)
 Range Law (1944)
 Frontier Outlaws (1944)
 Valley of Vengeance (1944)
 The Drifter (1944)
 Oath of Vengeance (1944)
 Flame of the West (1945)
 West of the Alamo (1946)
 Blazing Across the Pecos (1948)
 Law of the West (1949)
 Sierra (1950)
 Short Grass (1950)
 Fort Dodge Stampede (1951)
 Fargo (1952)
 Thief of Damascus (1952) — Gate Guard at beheading 
 Abbott and Costello Lost in Alaska (1952)
 Cow Country (1952–55)
 Ticket to Mexico (1952–55)
 Bad Men of Marysville (1952–55)
 Siren of Bagdad (1953)— Kazah's Man
 Five Guns West (1955) — Stephan Jethro
 Man Without a Star (1955) - Jessup - (Uncredited)
 A Big Hand for the Little Lady (1966)

Serials

 Undersea Kingdom (1936)
 The Vigilantes Are Coming (1936)
 Dick Tracy (1937)
 S.O.S. Coast Guard (1937)
 Zorro Rides Again (1937)
 The Lone Ranger (1937)
 Zorro Rides Again (1937)
 The Fighting Devil Dogs (1938)
 Dick Tracy Returns (1938)
 Terry and the Pirates (1940)
 Deadwood Dick (1940)
 The Green Archer (1940)
 White Eagle (1941)
 King of the Texas Rangers (1941)
 Perils of the Royal Mounted (1942)
 The Valley of Vanishing Men (1942)
 Billy the Kid Trapped (1942)
 Batman (1943)
Devil Riders (1943)
 Manhunt of Mystery Island (1945)
 Brenda Starr, Reporter (1945)
 The Monster and the Ape (1945)
 Jungle Raiders (1945)
 The Scarlet Horseman (1946)
 Hop Harrigan (1946)
 Chick Carter, Detective (1946)
 The Mysterious Mr. M (1946)
 Jack Armstrong (1947)
 The Vigilante: Fighting Hero of the West (1947)
 The Sea Hound (1947)
 Brick Bradford (1947)
 Superman (1948)
 Tex Granger, Midnight Rider of the Plains (1948)
 Congo Bill (1948)
 Bruce Gentry (1949)
 Cody of the Pony Express (1950)
 Atom Man vs. Superman (1950)
 Don Daredevil Rides Again (1951)
 Roar of the Iron Horse, Rail-Blazer of the Apache Trail (1951)
 Captain Video: Master of the Stratosphere (1951)
 King of the Congo (1952)
 Riding with Buffalo Bill (1954)

TV shows
 The Gene Autry Show (1950–1951) - Joe / Deputy Sam / Judd Parker / The Sheriff
 The Lone Ranger (1950–1953) - Sheriff Enright / Sheriff Collins
 The Cisco Kid (1950–1954) - Sheriff / Stableman / Homer Appleby / Henchman / Jeff's Older Henchman / Rocky, Blake Henchman / Jim Hardy / Henry P. Murdock
 The Adventures of Kit Carson (1951–1953) - Henchman / Parker / Deputy Callahan
 Hopalong Cassidy (1954) - Henchman
 Buffalo Bill, Jr. (1955) - Frank Snyder / Henchman Tulsa
 The Gabby Hayes Show (1956) - Henchman / Vance Sharp / Steve Martin
 Highway Patrol (1958) - Cliff Reynolds

References

External links
 
 

1902 births
1969 deaths
American male film actors
Burials at Oakwood Memorial Park Cemetery
Male actors from Illinois
Male film serial actors
20th-century American male actors